René Chocat (28 November 1920 – 18 July 2000) was a French basketball player. He was inducted into the French Basketball Hall of Fame, in 2012.

French national team
Chocat played the 1948 Summer Olympics, and at the 1952 Summer Olympics.

At the London 1948 Summer Olympic Games, he was a part of the senior French national team that won the silver medal. Four years later, at the 1952 Helsinki Summer Olympic Games, he was a member of the French team, which finished in eighth place.

References

External links
profile

1920 births
2000 deaths
French men's basketball players
Olympic basketball players of France
Basketball players at the 1948 Summer Olympics
Basketball players at the 1952 Summer Olympics
Olympic silver medalists for France
Olympic medalists in basketball
Medalists at the 1948 Summer Olympics
Small forwards
Union athlétique de Marseille players